Table tennis at the 2019 Parapan American Games was held in Lima, Peru. The winners of all single competitions qualified for the 2020 Summer Paralympics.

Matias Pino lost his medals due to a doping violation where he was found to have taken the stimulant octopamine on 24 August 2019, a banned substance in the World Anti-Doping Agency's 2019 Prohibited List. His gold medal was awarded to original silver medalist Ian Seidenfeld who also gained Pino's slot allocation for the 2020 Summer Paralympics and the results for the Chilean men's team class 6-8 led to a disqualification and their bronze medal stripped off.

Participating nations
There will be 128 table tennis players from 19 nations competing.

 (Host country)

Medal table

Medalists

Men's events

Women's events

See also
Table tennis at the 2019 Pan American Games
Table tennis at the 2020 Summer Paralympics

References

2019 Parapan American Games
2019 in table tennis